Franz Karl Ludwig von Wied zu Neuwied (19 October 1710 – 9 October 1765, in Neuwied) was a lieutenant general in Frederick the Great's army.  He received the Order of the Black Eagle and was proprietor of the 41st Infantry Regiment. His name is inscribed on the Equestrian statue of Frederick the Great.

References

1710 births
1765 deaths
Prussian military personnel of the Seven Years' War
Lieutenant generals of Prussia
Military personnel from Rhineland-Palatinate
People from Neuwied